Rockin' the Suburbs is the debut studio album by American alternative rock singer-songwriter Ben Folds. His first solo album after leaving his band Ben Folds Five, Rockin' the Suburbs was recorded in Adelaide, Australia, where Folds was living at the time and was released on the same day as the September 11 attacks.

"Rockin' the Suburbs" is Folds' only single to make Billboard'''s Modern Rock Tracks chart, peaking there at number 28. The album peaked at number 42 on the Billboard 200 chart, and at number 11 on the Top Internet Albums chart. A remake of the title track featuring William Shatner appeared in the soundtrack for the 2006 film Over the Hedge, which stars Shatner as an opossum named Ozzie.

Track listing

Track notes
According to Folds, "Not the Same" is based on a true story of a person he knew who, under the influence of LSD, climbed a tree at a party hosted by Darren Jessee (not Robert Sledge, as the song states), stayed in the tree overnight, and when he came down the next morning was a born-again Christian. Folds used Sledge's name instead of Jessee's in the lyrics because he thought "it sounded better".

Folds performed "Gone" with Street Corner Symphony on the finale of Season 2 of The Sing-Off'' and performed "Not the Same" with the Dartmouth Aires on the finale of Season 3.

Personnel
Credits adapted from album’s liner notes.

 Ben Folds – piano, vocals, keyboards, guitars, bass guitar, drums
 Richard Fortus – additional guitar (tracks 3, 10)
 Larry Corbett – cello (track 5)
 DJ Swamp – additional beats (track 10)
 Frally Hynes – additional vocals (track 4)
 John McCrea – additional vocals (track 5)
 John Mark Painter – strings conductor and arranger

Production
 Producers: Ben Folds, Ben Grosse
 Recording: Ben Grosse, Andrew R. Wallace
 Mixing: Ben Grosse
 Additional Engineers: Blumpy, Cameron Webb
 Assistant Engineers: Rick Behrens, Aaron Lepley, Chuck Bailey, Justin Pynes,  Uly Noriega, Dale Lawtone
 Programming: Ben Grosse, Andrew R. Wallace, Blumpy, Cameron Webb, John Vitale
 Programming Engineer: Andrew R. Wallace
 Mastering: Ted Jensen

Charts

Album

Singles

References

External links
 

Ben Folds albums
2001 debut albums
Epic Records albums
Albums produced by Ben Folds